Sigalit Landau (born 1969) is an Israeli sculptor, video and installation artist.

Biography
Sigalit Ethel Landau was born in Jerusalem. She was the eldest child of Simcha Landau, who immigrated to Israel from Bukovina, and  Maya Sonntag, who immigrated from London. In 1974-1975, the family lived in Philadelphia, and in 1978-1979 in London. Landau grew up on a hill in Jerusalem overlooking the Judean Desert. She attended Rubin Academy of Music High School and majored in dance. Between 1990 and 1995, she studied art at Bezalel Academy of Art and Design, including a semester as an exchange student at Cooper Union in New York City.

Art career

Landau is a multi-disciplinary artist whose work includes drawing, sculpture, video and performance art, sometimes self-standing and sometimes forming whole environments. Her complex works touch on social, historical, political, and ecological issues, embracing topics such as homelessness, banishment, and the relationships between victim and
victimizer and between decay and growth. As much of her work is concerned with the human condition, the body (often her own) is a key motif and guide. Using salt, sugar, paper and ready-made objects, Landau creates large-scale in site installations, which totally change the spaces she works in.
 
One of Landau's best-known works is Salt Works, a series of salt sculptures created by immersing metal sculptural frames into the Dead Sea.

In another work using salt, Landau put an early 20th century black dress into the Dead Sea for two months and documented how salt crystals coated the fabric and turned it white.

Exhibitions

1990s
In 1994, Landau showed in the group exhibition 'Tranzit' in the haunted spaces of floor 5, at the Tel Aviv Central Bus Station, and in Export Surplus, the Bugrashov Gallery's street show. Both shows were part of ArtFocus 1, and both early exhibitions dealt with nomadism and place, and deciphering the essence of these sites. In one, she inhabited a homeless shelter; in the other Landau created a castaway group show on the water breakers in front of Bugrashov beach.

In 1995 she showed her work Iron Door Tent with Guy Bar Amoz at the Israel Museum, Jerusalem.

In 1996 Landau exhibit at the 'Witte de With'. Following her Rotterdam experience, Landau made and showed 'Resident Alien I' the following year in the Herzliya Museum, and after that in Documenta X and at the 47th Venice Biennale. She deformed the metal floor of the cargo containers using heat and intense hammering to look like a function as hills.

Landau represented Israel at the Venice Biennale in 1997 and again in 2011. She exhibited at Documenta X in 1997.

In 1999 Landau exhibited her work in the Chisenhale Gallery, London, and then at Spacex in Exeter. The following year, she won the first Times/ArtAngel Open commission: to transformed a concrete mixer into a music box, she had every intention of "living in it forever and traveling with the story performed with it in the streets…".

2000s
In her 2001 New York City Exhibition, Sigalit turned the Thread Waxing space into a cotton candy crater, spinning the sweet fibers around herself and the audience, to the music of "Arab-Snow". 

Returning to Israel during the outburst of the Second Intifada, she worked with Haaretz newspaper front pages, transforming them each day into sculptures of fruit. Her outdoor drying area was the studio's roof, where she took her replete balls-crops-growths to dry. These balls were main part of her "The Country" Installation (2002) at the Alon Segev Gallery in Tel Aviv-Yafo.

She opened "The Endless Solution" in 2004 at the Tel Aviv Museum.

In "The Dining Hall" (2007) at Kunst-Werke Institute for Contemporary Art in Berlin, (Germany), She made a chain of installations dealing with private, communal, and public food, feeding and starving. Culminating in a monumental public sculpture of bloody doner kebabs, dedicated to the Turkish doner kebab carvers in the streets of Germany.

In 2008 she exhibited at the Museum of Modern Art, New York, project 87.

In 2008 her work Salt sails+Sugar knots was shown at Galerie Kamel Mennour, Paris.

2010s
In 2012 she showed her work Caryatid at The Negev Museum of Art, Beersheva, Israel. In 2015, the Museum of Contemporary Art of Barcelona featured a semi-retrospective of her work. In 2019 she showed her work Salt Years at the Museum der Moderne Salzburg.

2012 – Soil. Nur.sing, kamel mennour, Paris.
 2013 – ‘The Ram in the Thicket’ Maison Hermes in Ginza, Tokyo. Curator: Reiko Setsuda
 2013 – ‘ZBIB EL-ARD’ Har-El Printers & Publishers, Jaffa. Curator: Matti Harel

Permanent collections
Landau's work is included in the collections of:
Museum of Modern Art, New York,
Centre Pompidou, 
Magasin III, Stockholm
 Jewish Museum, New York
 Barcelona Museum of Contemporary Art, 
 Israel Museum,
Hirshhorn Museum and Sculpture Garden,
 Pomeranz Collection, 
 Tiroch DeLeon Collection,
 Tel Aviv Museum of Art.

Awards and recognition
 1993 Jewish National Fund Sculpture Award
 1994 America-Israel Cultural Fund
 1994 Mary Fisher Prize, Bezalel Academy of Arts and Design, Jerusalem
 1996 Ineborg Bachman Scholarship
 1998 Artist in Residence at the Hoffmann Collection, Berlin, Germany
 1999 First Prize in the British Competition by ArtAngel and London newspaper "The Times"
 2001 Acquisition Prize, Tel Aviv Museum of Art, Tel Aviv
 2001 Prize for a Young Artist, Israeli Ministry of Science, Culture and Sport
 2003 America-Israel Cultural Foundation Janet and George Jaffin Scholarship Prize
 2003 Residency, IASPIS – The International Artists Studio Program, Stockholm
 2004 Nathan Gottesdiener Foundation, The Israeli Art Prize, Tel Aviv Museum of Art, Tel Aviv
 2004 Beatrice S. Kolliner Award for Young Israeli Artist, Israel Museum, Jerusalem
 2007 The Dan Sandel and the Sandel Family Foundation Sculpture Award, Tel Aviv Museum of Art
 2012 'Artis' Grant Recipient
 2016 The Sandberg Prize for Israeli Art, Israel Museum, Jerusalem
 2017 Honorary Doctoral Degree, Ben-Gurion University of the Negev, Beersheba

Gallery

See also
Visual arts in Israel

References

External links
 Official web site
 *Podcast/interview with Sigalit Landau, 2015
 
 
 

1969 births
Living people
20th-century Israeli women artists
21st-century Israeli women artists
Artists from Jerusalem
Bezalel Academy of Arts and Design alumni
Israeli women sculptors
Israeli installation artists
Israeli people of Romanian-Jewish descent
Israeli contemporary artists